Rusty Bugles was a controversial Australian play written by Sumner Locke Elliott in 1948. It toured extensively throughout Australia between 1948–1949 and was threatened with closure by the New South Wales Chief Secretary's Office for obscenity.

Production history
It was first produced by Doris Fitton and Sydney's Independent Theatre company on 14 October 1948, and advertised as an "army comedy documentary". The announcement of its ban was made by J. M. Baddeley, Chief Secretary and acting Premier of New South Wales, on 22 October but after initially defying the ban, Doris Fitton avoided a forced closure by commissioning a rewrite from the author.

The Independent Theatre took the play, after an unprecedented 20-week run in New South Wales, to reopen The King's Theatre, Melbourne. Meanwhile, another company was playing "Rusty Bugles" at Killara, New South Wales, so it was the first Australian play to run simultaneously in two states. The words that were the subject of the ban gradually reappeared; no legal action was ever taken, though rewrites were demanded in different states.

At the end of its record six-month run in Melbourne, the production transferred to Adelaide, then returned to Sydney at The Tatler. But now critics were writing that it was being played for laughs, with the swearing self-conscious rather than part of the patois.

The publisher of the play, Currency Press, quotes Elliott as saying that Rusty Bugles was 'a documentary... Not strictly a play... it has no plot in the accepted sense'.  Elliott did not foresee that shortly after this, the genre of the theatre of the absurd would be established as a 'legitimate' dramatic form where plot and the delineation of character are less important than the insight offered into the implicit drama of most human interactions.

Cast (1948)
 Des Nolan ("Gig") – John Kingsmill
 Vic Richards – Ivor Bromley-Smith
 Sergeant Brooks – Sidney Chambers
 Rod Carsen – Ronald Frazer
 Andy Edwards ("The Little Corporal") – Robert Crome
 Otford ("Ot") – Alistair Roberts
 Mac – Frank O'Donnell
 Ollie – John Unicomb
 Chris – Kevin Healy
 "Darky" McClure – Lloyd Berrell
 "Keghead" Stephens – Ralph Peterson
 Corporal – doubled
 Ken Falcon ("Dean Maitland") – Michael Barnes
 First Private – Jack Wilkinson
 Second Private – James Lyons
 Bill Hendry (YMCA Sergeant) – Frank Curtain
 Private – Peter Hartland
 Jack Turner (Sigs Corporal) – doubled
 Sigs Private – doubled
 Sammy Kuhn – Kenneth Colbert

Adaptations
The play was adapted for TV by the ABC in 1965 and then later in 1981. Both versions were directed by Alan Burke who had directed the stage play in 1949.

The play was also adapted by the ABC for radio in 1965.

1981 film
Sumner Locke Elliot announced in the late 1970s he wanted the play to be filmed.

The ABC filmed it in 1981. It was the second last in a series of play adaptations on the ABC. By this stage the play was established as a modern classic - it had been published by Currency Press in 1980 - and the Herald called it "a wry, rich and intensely Australian comedy peopled by Australian soldiers who chafe at the boredom of life in an out of the way camp while their mates are off fighting a real war."

Alan Burke was again associated with the production as producer, although John Matthews was the director.

Cast
 Graham Corry		
 Gary Files as Andy Edwards
 Ian Gilmour as Rod Carson	
 Harold Hopkins as Vic Richards
 Mark Hembrow
 Jeremy Kewley
 Serge Lazareff
 Stephen Thomas as Eric Otford
 Graham Rouse
 Tony Barry
 Sean Scully
 Jack Allen as Mac

Reception
The Sydney Morning Herald called it "one of the more enjoyable programs" of the week, in which the performances "could not be bettered...  enjoyed it immensely."

The Age called it "heady stuff for expatriate Australians and those who have an ear for local slang... the letdowns and character development are predictable, if well done and amusing. What I enjoyed was the throwaway lines."

The critic from the Woman's Weekly complained about the "quaint, old-fashioned dialogue" and "some quaint, old-fashioned direction" in which "the viewer was never certain he was watching a photographed stage play or a badly re-enacted documentary... A study of boredom, became studiously boring."

The Canberra Times called the 1981 production "the sort of entertainment that makes satire redundant."

Another writer for the Age thought the ABC had "revived Rusty Bugles without bothering to work out what it was about" and complained about the historical accuracy of the uniforms.

See also
 List of television plays broadcast on Australian Broadcasting Corporation (1960s)

References

External links
 
 
 
 
 
 
 1980 TV play at Screen Australia
 Rusty Bugles 1980 TV play at Australian Screen Online

1948 plays
Australian films based on plays
Australian plays adapted into films
1981 television films
1981 films
Australian television plays
Plays about World War II